Russell Joseph McVinney (November 25, 1898—August 10, 1971) was an American prelate of the Roman Catholic Church. He served as bishop of the Diocese of Providence in Rhode Island from 1948 until his death in 1971.

Biography

Early life 
Russell McVinney was born in Warren, Rhode Island, to Thomas and Catherine (née Blessington) McVinney. He was baptized at St. Mary's of the Bay Church in Warren the following month. Shortly after his birth, McVinney and his family moved to the Mount Pleasant neighborhood of Providence. Since there was no parochial school at Blessed Sacrament Church, he attended Academy Avenue Grade School, the local public school. He also attended Father Simmons' School of Religion, the religious education program at Blessed Sacrament.

In 1912, McVinney enrolled at La Salle Academy in Providence, graduating in 1916. He then attended St. Charles College in Catonsville, Maryland, from 1916 to 1918, and continued his studies at the Grand Seminary of Montreal in Montreal, Quebec, in 1918. In 1920, McVinney entered St. Bernard's Seminary in Rochester, New York, staying there for one year. He completed his studies at the American College at Louvain in Leuven, Belgium.

Priesthood 
McVinney was ordained to the priesthood for the Diocese of Providence at Louvain on July 13, 1924. Following his return to Rhode Island, he briefly served on a temporary assignment at the Cathedral of SS. Peter and Paul in Providence before becoming a curate at St. Patrick's Parish in Harrisville, Rhode Island. From 1929 to 1936, he served as a curate at St. Edward's Parish and a teacher at St. Raphael Academy, both in Pawtucket, Rhode Island. In 1935, McVinney studied journalism for a year at the University of Notre Dame in South Bend, Indiana.

From 1936 to 1941, McVinney served as associate editor of the Providence Visitor and did pastoral work at the Cathedral of SS. Peter and Paul. He directed the diocesan pilgrimage to the Eucharistic Congress at New Orleans, Louisiana, in 1938. He served as the first rector of the newly opened Our Lady of Providence Seminary in Warwick, Rhode Island from 1941 to 1948. During his tenure as rector, he also served as pro-synodal examiner and secretary of the body of examiners of junior clergy (1943–1948).

Bishop of Providence 
On May 29, 1948, McVinney was appointed the fifth bishop of the Diocese of Providence by Pope Pius XII. He received his episcopal consecration on July 14, 1948, from Archbishop Amleto Giovanni Cicognani, with Bishops Henry O'Brien and James Connolly serving as co-consecrators. He was the first native of Rhode Island to serve as bishop of Providence. During his 23-year tenure in Providence, McVinney established 28 new parishes, mostly in rapidly growing suburban and rural areas of the diocese. He also established 40 new Catholic schools and oversaw the construction of new buildings for many preexisting schools. In 1954, he opened Our Lady of Fatima Hospital for the chronically ill, in North Providence, Rhode Island.

McVinney convoked the fourth synod of the diocese on October 8, 1952. He founded the Sisters of Our Lady of Providence in 1955 and later the Brothers of Our Lady of Providence in 1959. In 1957, in order to accommodate the increasing number of seminarians at Our Lady of Providence Seminary, he oversaw the construction of a complex of new buildings for the seminary. Between 1962 and 1965, McVinney attended all four sessions of the Second Vatican Council in Rome. Following the conclusion of the Council, he created a Diocesan Liturgical Commission in June 1964 and one of the first Diocesan Ecumenical Commissions in the United States in January 1965. He also established the Catholic Inner City Apostolate in 1966 and the Diocesan Human Relations Commission in 1967.

Reestablishment of the American College of Louvain
McVinney's alma mater, the American College in Belgium, closed on the eve of the Second World War. In 1949, the bishops of the United States began to talk of reestablishing the seminary. McVinney, along with Bishop Matthew Brady of the diocese of Manchester, became a forceful advocate of reestablishing the college.

When the bishops voted in 1951 to reestablish the American College, McVinney was made chair of the American College's new board of bishops. He appointed a priest of his diocese, Thomas Maloney, as the new rector. Maloney arrived back in Leuven in spring of 1952, and the new crop of seminarians, including a number from Providence, arrived that autumn. By the celebration of the college's centennial in 1957, the American College had been significant renovated and, as a result of the 1950s vocations boom in the United States, over a hundred seminarians were living and studying at McVinney's alma mater. McVinney, present at the centennial celebrations, was granted an honorary doctorate from the Catholic University of Louvain, alongside Bisholp Fulton J. Sheen.

Russell McVinney died in Watch Hill, Rhode Island, on August 10, 1971, at age 72

Views

Communion by hand
McVinney opposed the reception of Communion by hand, believing the practice violates the dignity of both the communicant and the consecrated Host. When the issue came before the National Conference of Catholic Bishops in 1970, he called the proposal a "dangerous procedure leading to a precipitous decline" and an invitation to "weirdos."

Divorce
McVinney took a strict interpretation of canon law regarding divorce. In October 1952, he declared that Catholic lawyers were forbidden "under pain of mortal sin" to represent plaintiffs in suits for separation, divorce or annulment of a marriage performed by a Catholic priest, unless they obtain prior permission of their bishop; that Catholics may not be present at marriages "attempted" by a Catholic before a non-Catholic clergyman or a justice of the peace, and they must not show their approval (e.g., by attending a wedding party, giving a wedding gift); that Catholics who are themselves invalidly married may not act as witnesses, ushers, or bridesmaids at a Catholic wedding; and that all Catholics are forbidden to act as witnesses, ushers or bridesmaids at weddings which are not performed by a Catholic priest.

Film
In 1957, McVinney exhorted Catholics to follow the Legion of Decency's ban against the 1956 film Baby Doll, even in its censored version.

Morality
In 1952, at the commencement ceremony of Manhattan College in New York City,  McVinney condemned contemporary morality that attempted to "ride on the coattails of democracy," and encouraged obedience to an "objective" ethical standard.

Politics
During the 1970 U.S. Senate election, McVinney chastised Father John McLaughlin, a Jesuit priest, for running for the United States Senate without McVinney's permission, saying McLaughlin's candidacy "has caused a great deal of confusion and misunderstanding in this state." McLaughlin claimed that he did not require McVinney's permission to run, and that his opponent, John O. Pastore, and McVinney were "lifelong friends."

See also

References

External links
American College at Louvain
Official site of the Holy See

1898 births
1971 deaths
20th-century Roman Catholic bishops in the United States
Catholic University of Leuven (1834–1968) alumni
American College of the Immaculate Conception alumni
La Salle Academy alumni
Roman Catholic bishops of Providence
Participants in the Second Vatican Council
St. Charles College alumni